Historia de un gran amor ("A Great Love Story") is a 1942 Mexican film. It stars Sara García. It is based on a novel by Pedro Antonio de Alarcón.

External links

1942 films
1940s Spanish-language films
Films based on works by Pedro Antonio de Alarcón
Mexican black-and-white films
Mexican drama films
1942 drama films
1940s Mexican films